SS Huddersfield was a passenger-cargo ship built for the Manchester, Sheffield and Lincolnshire Railway in 1872.

History

Huddersfield was built by John Elder and Company of Govan, Scotland, and launched on 23 September 1872. In 1897 she passed into the ownership of the Great Central Railway. 

On 26 May 1903 on leaving Antwerp, Belgium, she was in collision in the River Scheldt with the Norwegian steamer Uto and sank. All 22 of her passengers – emigrants from Galicia on their way to Canada - drowned. The crew of 17 were rescued by the company ship .

References

1872 ships
Steamships of the United Kingdom
Ships built on the River Clyde
Ships of the Manchester, Sheffield and Lincolnshire Railway
Ships of the Great Central Railway
Maritime incidents in 1903
Shipwrecks in rivers
Shipwrecks of Belgium